Atalibio Magioni (born 25 January 1947) is a Brazilian rower. He competed in the men's coxed pair event at the 1976 Summer Olympics.

References

1947 births
Living people
Brazilian male rowers
Olympic rowers of Brazil
Rowers at the 1976 Summer Olympics
Place of birth missing (living people)
Pan American Games medalists in rowing
Pan American Games gold medalists for Brazil
Rowers at the 1971 Pan American Games